Vicki J. Cocchiarella is a Democratic Party member of the Montana Senate, representing District 47 since 1998. Earlier she was a member of the Montana House of Representatives from 1989 through 1998, and was House Minority Leader from 1997 through 1998.

External links
Montana Senate - Vicki Cocchiarella official MT State Legislature website
Project Vote Smart - Senator Vicki J. Cocchiarella (MT) profile
Follow the Money - Vicki Cocchiarella
2006 2004 2000 1998 Senate campaign contributions
1996 1994 1992 1990 House campaign contributions

Democratic Party Montana state senators
Democratic Party members of the Montana House of Representatives
1949 births
Living people
Women state legislators in Montana
21st-century American women